Kristel Leesmend (born 30 August 1968 in Tallinn) is an Estonian actress.

From 1987 until 1988, Leesmend worked at the Vanalinnastuudio in Tallinn as a costume designer and as a freelance actress. In 1992 she graduated from Estonian Academy of Music and Theatre's Drama School and has been a freelance actress since. In 2002, she worked as a supervisor at the Tallinn University of Technology's student theatre, T-Theater. From 2003 until 2006, she director of casting for the Estonian Casting Agency (Allfilm).  Besides theatrical roles she has also played in several films.

Leesmend was in a relationship with actor Ivo Uukkivi, the pair have a daughter, born in 1995, with whom she has a very close relationship.

Selected filmography

 1993 Tallinn pimeduses (feature film; role: Department store salesclerk)
 1994 Jüri Rumm (feature film; role Eliisabet) 
 2006 	Ruudi (feature film; role: Nurse)
 2008 	Doktor Kloun (documentary film; director and scenarist)
 2011 	Surnuaiavahi tütar (feature film; role: Ilse)
 2012 	Üksik saar (feature film; role: Sick woman)
 2012 Kõik muusikud on kaabakad (feature film; role: Külli)
 2016  Mäel (short film; role: Maria)

References

Living people
1968 births
Estonian film actresses
Estonian stage actresses
Estonian television actresses
20th-century Estonian actresses
21st-century Estonian actresses
Estonian Academy of Music and Theatre alumni
Actresses from Tallinn